In mathematics, a trident curve (also trident of Newton or parabola of Descartes) is any member of the family of curves that have the formula:

Trident curves are cubic plane curves with an ordinary double point in the real projective plane at x = 0, y = 1, z = 0; if we substitute x =  and y =  into the equation of the trident curve, we get

which has an ordinary double point at the origin. Trident curves are therefore rational plane algebraic curves of genus zero.

References

External links
 

Algebraic curves